Bracondale School was a private boys' school in the Bracondale area of Norwich, Norfolk. It existed from 1821 to 1993.

History
The school was opened in 1821,  by DB Hickey. The school was sometimes known as Bracondale School for Boys.

Dr Francis Darkins Wheeler was the headmaster of Paragon House School, and he brought his boys from that school, taking over Bracondale. He was headmaster for 19 years; a street (Wheeler Road) on the Miles Cross Estate is named after him. A later headmaster was Frederick E Scott. The headmaster until 1985 was Dr. Donald Cole. The final headmaster was Denzil Gaudoin (1985-1993).

The school's aims and objectives were "To produce happy and decent young gentlemen who do their best, and have consideration for the welfare and feelings of others". Pupils were known as Bracondolians, and Peppermint Boys, from the colour of their caps. The school had its own scout group (33rd Norwich).

Closure
The school ran out of money, and closed suddenly in 1993.

The school building was Grade II listed in 1972. The list entry makes it clear that the school building was originally a house.

The school is now housing, part of a Norwich Housing Society estate built in 1999. The school's war memorial remains in the main school building.

Old Boys
Notable old boys include:
Donald Cunnell, WWI flying ace.
Bill Edrich, test cricketer
Eric Edrich, first-class cricketer
Geoff Edrich, first-class cricketer
John Edrich, test cricketer
Ralph Hale Mottram, writer and Lord Mayor of Norwich
George Skipper, architect
Harold Theobald, cricketer and footballer

There is a Bracondale School Association; when the school was still operational there was a Bracondale School Old Boys' Union.

Further reading

References 

Defunct schools in Norfolk
1821 establishments in England
Educational institutions established in 1821
Educational institutions disestablished in 1993
1993 disestablishments in England